Goult is a commune in the Vaucluse department in the Provence-Alpes-Côte d'Azur region in southeastern France. The village is perched on a hill with a solitary road to the peak. Near the end of the road is a 12th-century castle, the Château de Goult.

Geography
The commune lies in the parc naturel régional du Luberon.

The Calavon flows westward through the southern part of the commune.

Places and monuments 
 Goult castle
 Saint Véran chapel
 Windmill
 Notre Dame des Lumières church

See also

 Luberon
 Côtes de Ventoux AOC
 Côtes du Luberon AOC
Communes of the Vaucluse department

References

External links
Official website
 Notre-Dame de Lumières, a priory in Goult 

Communes of Vaucluse